Arathwada is a village in the district of Sirohi in Rajasthan state in Western India. It has a population of about 8000, most of whom are members of the Jain (Gadiya) community. 
Arathwada has a  Jain temple of paraswnath bhagwan The nearest  village is Posalia, which has a Jain temple of Sri Posli Paraswnath Bhagwaan and a very ancient temple of Sri Lokeshwar Mahadev.

Villages in Sirohi district